Terrance Mahoney may refer to:

Terrance Mahoney, character in Smugglers' Cove
Terrance Mahoney, character in Angels in Disguise (film)